LaForce is a surname. Notable people with the name include:

Allie LaForce (born 1988), American sports journalist
David S. LaForce, American artist
Ernie Laforce (1916–2009), Canadian ice hockey player

See also
La-Force, surname
LeForce, surname